Palaeovaranidae, formerly known as Necrosauridae, is an extinct clade of varanoid lizards known from the Paleogene of Europe. It contains three genera.

Genera 

 Eosaniwa Haubold, 1977 Geiseltal, Germany, Eocene
 Palaeovaranus Zittel, 1887  (Formerly Necrosaurus) Messel Pit, Germany, Quercy Phosphorites Formation, France, Eocene
 Paranecrosaurus Smith & Habersetzer, 2021  (Formerly "Saniwa" feisti) Messel Pit, Germany, Eocene

References

Eocene lizards
Anguimorpha
Prehistoric reptile families